The Bling Ring is a 2013 crime film written and directed by Sofia Coppola featuring an ensemble cast led by Emma Watson, Katie Chang, Israel Broussard, Taissa Farmiga, and Claire Julien. It is based on the 2010 Vanity Fair article "The Suspects Wore Louboutins" by Nancy Jo Sales, which dealt with a real-life gang known as the Bling Ring. The story follows a group of fame-obsessed teenagers who use the internet to track celebrities' whereabouts in order to burgle their homes.

The film was an international co-production by producers in the United States, the United Kingdom, France, Germany, and Japan. Coppola began developing a screenplay based on the real-life burglaries in December 2011. Casting took place in early 2012, and principal photography started in March of that same year in Los Angeles, California.

The Bling Ring had its world premiere on May 1, 2013, in the Un Certain Regard section of the 2013 Cannes Film Festival. In the United States, it had a limited theatrical release by A24 on June 14, 2013, before opening wide one week later. It received generally positive reviews from critics, with many praising the cast and Coppola's "stylish" direction; Watson in particular received critical acclaim for her performance. However, others criticized the film for its morally ambiguous approach towards the subject matter.

The Bling Ring represents the final work of cinematographer Harris Savides, who died of brain cancer while the film was in post-production. The film is dedicated to him.

Plot
Quiet teenager Marc Hall arrives as a new student at Indian Hills High School in Agoura Hills, California. Soon after arriving, he is befriended by fame-obsessed Rebecca Ahn. While at a party at her house, Rebecca persuades Marc to sneak away with her, and the pair check the doors of cars on the street, taking valuables such as cash and credit cards from unlocked vehicles. They begin hanging out after school, and Marc starts to see Rebecca as a sister figure.

One day, Rebecca asks Marc if he knows anyone who is out of town, and he mentions that a wealthy acquaintance is in Jamaica. She convinces Marc to join her in breaking into the empty house, where she steals a handbag similar to one that her idol Lindsay Lohan has, cash, and the keys to a Porsche, which the pair use to flee the scene. They go on a shopping spree with the money, buying themselves luxury items like the ones they have previously admired in magazines.

Marc visits a nightclub with Rebecca and her friends (who include Nicki Moore, Nicki's adoptive sister Sam, and Chloe Tainer), where they ogle celebrities Kirsten Dunst and Paris Hilton. Later, while researching Hilton on the internet, Marc and Rebecca realize she is out of town. They find her address, go to her house, and, upon finding a key under the doormat, break in. They go through Hilton's belongings and take some jewelry with them, including a bracelet that Rebecca later flaunts to Nicki, Sam, and Chloe at a party.

At Nicki's request, Rebecca and Marc take her, Sam, and Chloe back to Hilton's house. The group marvels at the excess of Hilton's lifestyle and steals shoes, bags, dresses, cash, and jewelry. A drunk Chloe gets into an accident while driving away; she is arrested and sentenced to community service.

Marc and Rebecca return to rob Hilton's house on a third occasion and are nearly discovered by security. They then rob the home of Audrina Patridge, using the internet to determine when she will not be home. The group sells unwanted bags and other items at an outdoor market.

The entire group burgles the home of Megan Fox, wherein Nicki's younger sister Emily squeezes through a pet door to gain access to the house. Nicki discovers a handgun inside, and Sam playfully threatens Marc with it before taking it to her boyfriend Rob's home. When he grabs her, the gun goes off, though no one is injured.

The group enters the home of Orlando Bloom and his girlfriend, Miranda Kerr. The girls steal various items and Marc finds a case filled with seven of Bloom's Rolex watches and a roll of cash. Chloe helps Marc sell the watches to her friend Ricky, a night club manager. The teens later return to Hilton's house with Rob, who finds and steals large amounts of jewelry.

A news report containing security footage from the robbery at Patridge's home concerns Marc, but Rebecca is undeterred. She instigates a burglary at the home of Rachel Bilson, and the group ultimately breaks into Lohan's house and robs it. Shortly thereafter, Rebecca moves to Las Vegas with her father, ostensibly due to troubles at home, leaving some of her stolen items with Marc.

Media coverage of the Hollywood Hills burglaries intensifies, and the group acquires the label "The Bling Ring". Authorities ultimately identify the group using security footage from several robberies, statements from members of the group's social circle who heard its members brag about their exploits at drug-fueled parties, and photographs of the stolen items posted by the group on social media sites. Marc, Nicki, Chloe, Rebecca, Rob, and Ricky are arrested; Sam was not caught on camera and is able to avoid suspicion.

A remorseful Marc cooperates with the police, informing them of details of the burglaries, much to the chagrin of Rebecca, whom he identifies as the ringleader. A Vanity Fair journalist interviews Marc, still apparently exhibiting regret for his actions, but amazed at how much attention he has gotten, and Nicki, who claims the others were at fault and she is a religious humanitarian. When the group is prosecuted, they receive varying amounts of jail time and are ordered to pay millions of dollars in restitution for the stolen items. Marc is transported to prison, alone among various older criminals.

In the final scene, Nicki recounts her 30 days in jail on a talk show and reveals that Lohan was in the same facility at the same time. She then turns to the camera and promotes her website, where people can learn everything about her "journey".

Cast

 Israel Broussard as Marc Hall (based on Nick Prugo)
 Katie Chang as Rebecca Ahn (based on Rachel Lee)
 Emma Watson as Nicolette "Nicki" Moore (based on Alexis Neiers)
 Taissa Farmiga as Sam Moore (based on Tess Taylor)
 Claire Julien as Chloe Tainer (based on Courtney Ames)
 Carlos Miranda as Rob Hernandez (based on Roy Lopez, Jr.)
 Gavin Rossdale as Ricky (based on Johnny Ajar)
 Leslie Mann as Laurie Moore (based on Andrea Arlington-Dunn)
 Georgia Rock as Emily Moore (based on Gabby Neiers and Diana Tamayo)
 Annie Fitzgerald as Kate (based on Nancy Jo Sales)
 Stacy Edwards as Mrs. Hall
 G. Mac Brown as Henry
 Marc Coppola as Mr. Hall
 Janet Song as Mrs. Ahn
 Doug DeBeech as Adam
 Erin Daniels as Shannon
 Halston Sage as Amanda
 Patricia Lentz as Judge Henley
 Maika Monroe as Beach Girl
 Logan Miller as Kid at Party

Cameos
 Paris Hilton as herself
 Kirsten Dunst as herself
 Brett Goodkin as himself

Production

Development
In December 2011, it was reported that Sofia Coppola was developing a screenplay for a film based on the Bling Ring burglaries, to be directed and produced by herself. Her father, Francis Ford Coppola, executive produced the project through his American Zoetrope production company. In April 2012, it was announced that financing had been set up with NALA Films and Roman Coppola would also serve as a producer.

Coppola  described the group of teenage criminals as "products of our growing reality TV culture". The female characters in the film were seen as a departure from Coppola's previous works centered around the female perspective. Discussing the difference between the female perspective in Lost in Translation versus The Bling Ring she says that instead of a woman trying to find herself in a new foreign country, The Bling Ring deals with "girls trying on other people's stuff to find themselves". Although The Bling Ring deals with more consumerist and gaudy sense of style and culture Coppola says the film was "just really fun to indulge this style that's so different from my own. I'm more associated with being understated and [with] good taste, I think, and it's fun to be really obnoxious."

Casting
Coppola chose to use young, unknown actors (aside from Emma Watson) who were the same age as the real kids because of the freshness they brought to the film. Emma Watson joined the cast of the film on February 29, 2012, and on March 1, Taissa Farmiga was reported to have joined the main cast. Also in early March, The Hollywood Reporter confirmed the casting of Leslie Mann and Israel Broussard. On March 16, Claire Julien joined the cast, and Katie Chang and Georgia Rock were also confirmed for roles. That same month, Carlos Miranda was cast in a supporting role. In late March, Kirsten Dunst and Paris Hilton were both confirmed to have cameos in the film as themselves. Gavin Rossdale was filming his scenes around the same time.

Filming
Production primarily took place in and around Los Angeles, California, in March and April 2012, notably in West Hollywood, Lynwood, and Venice. Paris Hilton, who was a victim of the actual Bling Ring robberies, and Kirsten Dunst both made cameo appearances in the film. Some scenes were shot in the celebrity victims' homes and at the Century Regional Detention Facility in Lynwood, California.

Soundtrack

The Bling Ring: Original Motion Picture Soundtrack was supervised by frequent Coppola collaborator Brian Reitzell. The soundtrack album was released on June 11, 2013, by Def Jam Recordings. It contains a mix of music ranging between such genres as hip-hop/rap, krautrock, and electronic.

The musical score for the film was written by Reitzell in collaboration with Daniel Lopatin, known mostly under the recording name of Oneohtrix Point Never. Coppola's husband's band, Phoenix, also contributed the title track from their album Bankrupt!.

Reitzell worked closely with Coppola to find contemporary music that would fit within the film's setting. After being contacted for song contributions, rapper Kanye West recommended Reitzell use Frank Ocean's then-unreleased "Super Rich Kids."

Tracklist

Distribution

Release
In January 2013, A24 acquired domestic distribution rights to the film. It opened the Un Certain Regard section of the 2013 Cannes Film Festival on May 16. About the premiere in Cannes, Coppola said, "It seems like the perfect setting for The Bling Ring when you see people walking around in their heels. It's a glamorous place, so it feels appropriate." The film closed the 39th Seattle International Film Festival on June 9, 2013.

Home media
The Bling Ring was released via digital download on September 6, 2013, and on DVD and Blu-ray on September 17, 2013, by Lionsgate Home Entertainment. The extras include a behind the scenes making-of documentary, a short piece about the real Bling Ring, and a tour by Bling Ring target Paris Hilton of her home (which was a crime scene as well as a filming location).

Reception

Box office
In its debut weekend in the United States, the film opened in five theaters and earned $214,395, for a per-theater average of $42,879. It was Coppola's best opening per-theater average, beating out Lost in Translation intake of $40,221 for each of 23 locations in 2003. The following weekend, The Bling Ring expanded to 650 theaters, earning $2 million, for a per-theater average of $3,080. The film went on to gross $5.8 million domestically and $20 million worldwide.

Critical response
The Bling Ring received generally positive reviews from critics. Review aggregator website Rotten Tomatoes gives the film a 60% “Fresh” approval rating, based on reviews from 208 critics, with a weighted average of 6.3/10. The website's critical consensus reads, "While it's certainly timely and beautifully filmed, The Bling Ring suffers from director Sofia Coppola's failure to delve beneath the surface of its shallow protagonists' real-life crimes." Metacritic has assigned the film an average score of 66 out of 100, based on 40 reviews from mainstream critics, indicating "generally positive reviews". The film has drawn comparisons to the Day-Glo cinematography of Harmony Korine's Spring Breakers, which was also released under A24 Films.

Owen Gleiberman of Entertainment Weekly had a positive opinion, writing, "Watching The Bling Ring, the audience is invited to understand the impulses of these child-woman thieves, even as Coppola stands firmly apart from their craziness and sees them for who they are." Robbie Collin of The Daily Telegraph stated, "Everything comes together for the good here: visuals, performances, raucous soundtrack, Coppola's teasing flirtation with, yet ultimate lack of commitment to, some kind of concrete morality." Todd McCarthy of The Hollywood Reporter was less positive, stating, "Coppola's attitude toward her subject seems equivocal, uncertain; there is perhaps a smidgen of social commentary, but she seems far too at home in the world she depicts to offer a rewarding critique of it."

Watson's performance as Nicki Moore was critically acclaimed. Richard Roeper called her "comedic gold,"  while Gleiberman wrote that Watson "proves that her willingness to take chances is only growing and that she's an actress serious enough to turn a line like 'Your butt looks awesome!' into something that reveals character." Cath Clarke of Time Out commented positively on Watson, saying, "The real story here isn't the good-girl-goes-bad stunt casting; it's that Watson can act. Against the odds, the Harry Potter star gives a sharp, knowing smart performance as Nicki." Peter Travers of Rolling Stone wrote, "Watson is sensational as Nicki, an underage club girl and actress wanna-be, who lives in a universe of Valley Girl narcissism eons away from Hogwarts." Even critics who gave the film overall negative reviews singled out Watson for praise, with Peter Howell of the Toronto Star stating, "The undistinguished young cast of The Bling Ring has just one standout, and that's Emma Watson, who plays one of the most vacuous of the juvenile thieves. We know her best as the brainy Hermione Granger from the Harry Potter movies, and she can obviously do brainless equally well." Joe Neumaier of New York Daily News wrote, "Watson, though, does a great imitation of hollow-eyed gaze; her character is the one who tries to parlay notoriety into success (everyone else can, she figures). The one-time Harry Potter star captures the slack-jawed fan only too well."

Accolades

References

External links
 
 
 
 
 

2013 films
2013 crime drama films
2013 independent films
2010s heist films
2010s satirical films
2010s teen drama films
A24 (company) films
American crime drama films
American films based on actual events
American heist films
American independent films
American satirical films
American teen drama films
American Zoetrope films
British crime drama films
British films based on actual events
British heist films
British independent films
British satirical films
British teen drama films
Crime films based on actual events
Drama films based on actual events
English-language French films
English-language German films
English-language Japanese films
Films based on newspaper and magazine articles
Films about social media
Films directed by Sofia Coppola
Films scored by Daniel Lopatin
Films set in 2008
Films set in 2009
Films set in Los Angeles County, California
Films shot in Los Angeles
Films with screenplays by Sofia Coppola
French crime drama films
French films based on actual events
French heist films
French independent films
French satirical films
French teen films
German crime drama films
German heist films
German independent films
German satirical films
German teen drama films
Home invasions in film
Japanese crime drama films
Japanese heist films
Japanese independent films
Japanese satirical films
Japanese teen drama films
Pathé films
StudioCanal films
Teen crime films
Tobis Film films
2010s English-language films
2010s American films
2010s British films
2010s French films
2010s Japanese films
2010s German films